Maximiliano Pereira is the name of:

Maximiliano Pereira (footballer, born 1984), Uruguayan footballer
Maximiliano Pereira (footballer, born 1993), Uruguayan footballer

See also
Maximiliano Pereiro (born 1990), Uruguayan footballer